Geumgok-dong may refer to several places in Korea:
 Geumgok-dong, Busan
 Geumgok-dong, Seo-gu, Incheon
 Geumgok-dong, Dong-gu, Incheon
 Geumgok-dong, Gwangju
 Geumgok-dong, Suwon
 Geumgok-dong, Seongnam
 Geumgok-dong, Hwaseong
 Geumgok-dong, Namyangju
 Geumgok-dong, Suncheon
 Geumgok-dong, Andong